Hinduism has been spread in Russia primarily due to the work of scholars from the religious organization International Society for Krishna Consciousness (ISKCON) and by itinerant Swamis from India and small communities of Indian immigrants. While ISKCON appear to have a relatively strong following in Russia, the other organizations in the list have a marginal presence in this country. There is an active Tantra Sangha operating in Russia. According to the 2012 official census, there are 140,000 Hindus in Russia, which accounts for 0.1% population of Russia. A majority of Russian Hindus were Vaishnavites.

History

The history of Hinduism in Russia dates back to at least the 16th century. When Astrakhan was conquested in 1556, the small Indian community became part of the Moscow state. In the early 18th century, Peter the Great, the first Russian Emperor, met Astrakhan Hindus and on their request asked the Russian Senate to issue a law for protecting the beliefs of Hindus. This was the first law in Russia to protect foreign religion.

In 1971 A.C. Bhaktivedanta Swami Prabhupada, the founder of the International Society for Krishna Consciousness (ISKCON), introduced it to Russia. In 1988, ISKCON was first registered as a religion. Later, it was re-registered in 1998. In the same year, there were 120 Krishna communities in Russia.

In 2007, an idol of Hindu deity Vishnu, dated between 7th to 10th century CE, was excavated from the Russian town Staraya Mayna of  Ulyanovsk Oblast.

Hindu denominations in Russia

Vaishnavism
As of December 2005, the Federal Registration Service recorded 79 Hindu groups with a particular orientation on Krishnaism. These are the International Society for Krishna Consciousness, ISKCON Revival Movement, Science of Identity Foundation, Sri Chaitanya Saraswat Math, among others.

Shaivism

Hindu reform movements
Hindu reform movements which have presence in Russia are the Brahma Kumaris, Ramakrishna Mission, Arya Samaj, Sri Aurobindo Ashram, International Sivananda Yoga Vedanta Centres, Ananda Marga, Ananda Sangha, Self-Realization Fellowship, Sri Ramana Ashram, Sahaja Yoga, Sri Chinmoy Centre, Sanatan Sanstha, Sathya Sai Baba movement, Science of Identity Foundation, Shri Prakash Dham, the organizations associated with Maharishi Mahesh Yogi and Haidakhan Babaji, and others. Brahma Kumaris have 20 centres, Ramakrishna Mission has one centre, Ananda Marga has a centre in Barnaul, Tantra Sangha has one registered branch in Moscow and another in Nizhniy Novgorod was officially recognized in 1993.

Slavic Vedism

Slavic, Russian or Peterburgian Vedism, Neo-Vedism or simply Vedism are terms used to describe the contemporary indigenous development of Vedic forms of religion in Russia, Siberia, other Slavic countries, the Commonwealth of Independent States' members and generally all the post-Soviet states.

Slavic Vedism involves the use of Vedic rituals and worship of ancient Vedic deities, distinguishing from other groups which have maintained a stronger bond with modern Indian Hinduism, although Krishnaite groups often identify themselves as "Vedic" too.

Also some syncretic groups within the Slavic Native Faith ("Rodnovery") such as Peterburgian Vedism use the term "Vedism" and worship Vedic gods, but mainstream Rodnovery is characterised by its use of indigenous Slavic rituals and Slavic names for the gods.

Demography

According to the 2012 official census, Hinduism is practised by 140,000 people, or 0.1% of the total population. It constitutes 12% of the population in the Altai Republic, 5% in Samara Oblast, 4% in Khakassia, Kalmykia, Bryansk Oblast, Kamchatka, Kurgan Oblast, Tyumen Oblast and Chelyabinsk Oblast, 3% in Sverdlovsk Oblast, 2% to 3% in Yamalia, Krasnodar Krai, Stavropol Krai, Rostov Oblast and Sakhalin Oblast, and 0.1% to 0.2% in other federal subjects.

In 2006, the Russian capital Moscow has an estimated 10,000 Hare Krishna devotees and at least 5,000 Indians, Sri Lankans, Nepalese, and Mauritians following Hindu denominations.

The number of ISKCON followers in Russia is disputed. According to the Sanjeet Jha of the Association of Indians of Russia, Russia's Krishna population is estimated to be as high as 250,000, while Filatov of the Institute of Oriental Studies estimates Russia's Krishna population to be 15,000. According to Bhakti Vijnana Goswami, a Russian Iskcon guru, there were 50,000 active Hare Krishna devotees in Russia in 2011.

Prominent Russian Hindus
Indra Devi, Russian yoga teacher
Yekaterina Lisina, Russian basketball player who competed for the Russian National Team at the 2008 Summer Olympics
Sati Kazanova, Russian singer, fashion model, actress and TV personality

See also
 Astrakhan Oblast
 Bhagavad Gita trial in Russia
 Hindu Council of Russia
 Hinduism by country
 Religion in Russia

References

Sources
 
 Kotin, I. U. Индийцы в России=Indians in Russia. — Саарбрюкен: LAP, 2011. — 97 p.

External links
 
 
 
 
 
 
 
 
 
 
 
 
 
 
 Collection of Mysteries Monastery - Slavic Vedism